Salim Hanifi (born 11 April 1988 in Algeria) is an Algerian professional footballer. He currently plays for CR Belouizdad in the Algerian Ligue Professionnelle 1.

Personal
Hanifi is originally from the village of Sidi Aïch.

Club career
On June 12, 2011, Hanifi signed a two-year contract with JS Kabylie. On July 16, 2011, he made his debut for the club as an 83rd-minute substitute in a 2011 CAF Confederation Cup group stage match against MAS Fez of Morocco. On July 30, 2011, he scored his first goal for the club, in the second group stage match against Sunshine Stars of Nigeria.

Honours
 Top scorer of the 2010–11 Algerian Ligue Professionnelle 2 with RC Kouba with 20 goals

References

External links

1988 births
Algerian footballers
Algerian Ligue Professionnelle 1 players
Algerian Ligue 2 players
Kabyle people
Living people
RC Kouba players
JS Kabylie players
USM Alger players
CR Belouizdad players
People from Sidi-Aïch
Association football forwards
21st-century Algerian people